Mário Barreto Corrêa Lima (Ceará, 7 September 1935), is a Brazilian generalist doctor, professor and one of the founders of UNIMED in Rio de Janeiro.

He is also 1955 Miss Brasil Emilia Correa Lima's brother.

References

Brazilian general practitioners
1935 births
Living people